The Adults with Incapacity (Scotland) Act 2000 (2000 asp 4) is an Act of the Scottish Parliament. It was passed on 29 March 2000, receiving royal assent on 9 May. It concerns the welfare of adults (the age of legal capacity in Scotland being 16) who are unable to make decisions for themselves because they have a mental disorder or are not able to communicate. It provides the framework for other people (such as carers) to act on the behalf of people with incapacity.

The Act was one of the first pieces of legislation passed by the Scottish Parliament upon it being reconvened in 1999.

Content
Part 2 of the act concerns power of attorney and provides the framework for an individual (whilst they have capacity) to appoint someone to act as their continuing (financial) or welfare attorney.

Part 3 of the act concerns the accounts and funds of the adult with incapacity. It enables access to the bank or building society account of the adult with incapacity, in order to pay their costs of living.

Part 4 of the act concerns the management of finances of adults with incapacity who are residents of registered establishments including health service or private hospitals, psychiatric hospitals, state hospitals and care home services.

Part 5 of the act concerns medical research and treatment of adults with incapacity. It allows, under certain circumstances, medical research to be carried out on adults unable to give consent.

Part 6 of the act concerns intervention orders and guardianship orders. An intervention order can be applied for by, or on behalf of, an adult with incapacity and granted by the sheriff court. It may cover welfare or financial matters. An application for a guardianship order may be made by individuals or by a local authority regarding an adult with incapacity who may have long-term needs.

Part 7 of the act ("Miscellaneous") makes it an offence for an individual to wilfully neglect an adult with incapacity.

See also
Mental Capacity Act 2005
Capacity in Scots law

References
Footnotes

Sources

Acts of the Scottish Parliament 2000
Disability law in the United Kingdom
Health law in Scotland
Human rights in Scotland
Mental health in Scotland
Mental health law in the United Kingdom
Psychiatric assessment
Welfare in Scotland
Capacity (law)
Disability in Scotland